Tajuria deudorix is a species of lycaenid or blue butterfly found in the Indomalayan realm

Subspecies
T. d. cyrus Druce, 1895  Borneo
T. d. deudorix Philippines  
T. d. ingeni (Corbet, 1948)  Langkawi, Peninsular Malaya, Thailand, Singapore, Sumatra
T. d. primitivoi Osada, 1987
T. d. yuhkichi Hayashi, 1984
T. d. zoletai  Osada, 1987 Philippines

References

Tajuria
Butterflies described in 1869